George Hilton dos Santos Cecílio (born 11 June 1971) more commonly known as George Hilton is a Brazilian politician and radio personality. Although born in Bahia, he has spent his political career representing Minas Gerais, having served as state representative since 2007.

Personal life
Before becoming a politician Hilton worked as a radio personality. He is also an ordained pastor with the Universal Church of the Kingdom of God, although he says that his religion does not influence his political decisions.

Political career
Hilton served two consecutive terms in the Legislative Assembly of Minas Gerais, between 1999 and 2007, for the PSL and PL parties. In 2006, he was elected federal deputy for Minas Gerais, being re-elected successively in 2010 and 2014. During the period he was a member of the Progressive Party, and from 2009 until 2016, he was affiliated to the Brazilian Republican Party.

On 23 December 2014, it was officially announced that Hilton was appointed as the future Brazilian Minister of Sportfor during the second term of the Dilma Rousseff's cabinet.

After being appointed to be minister of sports, the Brazilian Republican party announced that they would be expelling Hilton as the party was in opposition to the government of Dilma Rousseff, with Hilton joining the Republican Party of the Social Order. On 23 March 2016, he left the ministry of sport, with Ricardo Leyser being appointed his successor.

On April 17, 2016, George Hilton voted against opening the impeachment process of then president Dilma Rousseff. Subsequently, he voted against the PEC on the Ceiling of Public Spending. In January 2017, he joined the Brazilian Socialist Party. In August of the same year, he voted in favor of the process calling for the opening of a corruption investigation into then president Michel Temer.

References

1971 births
Living people
Brazilian radio personalities
Brazilian Pentecostal pastors
Members of the Universal Church of the Kingdom of God
Social Liberal Party (Brazil) politicians
Liberal Party (Brazil, 1985) politicians
Progressistas politicians
Republicans (Brazil) politicians
Republican Party of the Social Order politicians
Brazilian Socialist Party politicians
Social Christian Party (Brazil) politicians
Members of the Chamber of Deputies (Brazil) from Minas Gerais
Members of the Legislative Assembly of Minas Gerais
People from Alagoinhas
Sports ministers of Brazil